Abraham Isaí Romero González (born 18 February 1998) is a professional footballer who plays as a goalkeeper for Major League Soccer club Los Angeles FC. Born in the United States, he represented the Mexico national under-21 team.

Club career

Los Angeles Galaxy II
On January 30, 2019, USL Championship club Los Angeles Galaxy II announced that they had signed Romero for the 2019 season.

Orange County SC
On January 27, 2021, USL Championship club Orange County SC announced that they had signed Romero for the 2021 season.

Las Vegas Lights
On February 4, 2022, USL Championship club Las Vegas Lights FC announced that they had signed Romero for the 2022 season. On July 19, 2022, Romero was named USL Championship Player of the Week for Week 19 of the 2022 season after earning a shutout against Rio Grande Valley FC.

Los Angeles FC
On January 26, 2023, Romero signed a one-year contract with Major League Soccer side Los Angeles FC.

International career

Youth
Romero was called up for the 2017 FIFA U-20 World Cup.

Romero was included in the under-21 roster that participated in the 2018 Toulon Tournament, where Mexico would finish runners-up.

Honours
Orange County SC
USL Cup: 2021

Mexico U17
CONCACAF U-17 Championship: 2015

Notes

References

External links

LA Galaxy Profile
Abraham Romero Mexico U-17

1998 births
Living people
People from Altadena, California
Soccer players from California
Sportspeople from Pasadena, California
Mexican footballers
Mexico youth international footballers
American soccer players
American sportspeople of Mexican descent
Association football goalkeepers
LA Galaxy II players
Orange County SC players
Las Vegas Lights FC players
USL Championship players
Los Angeles FC players